The 1940 United States Senate election in Texas was held on November 5, 1940. Incumbent Democratic U.S. Senator Tom Connally was re-elected to his third term in office, with only minor opposition in the Democratic primary and general elections.

Democratic primary

Candidates
A. P. Belcher
Tom Connally, incumbent U.S. Senator since 1929
Guy B. Fisher

Results

General election

Results

See also 
 1940 United States Senate elections

References

Texas
1940
Senate